Dianne van Giersbergen (born 3 June 1985) is a Dutch spinto soprano singer. She is the founder and frontwoman of the progressive metal band Ex Libris, and she was the vocalist of German symphonic metal band Xandria from 2013 to 2017. 

She is not related to Dutch singer Anneke van Giersbergen.

Early life and education 
Dianne van Giersbergen received her first singing lessons as a birthday present from her parents at the age of four. In the following years, she was taught by several professors and sang in several choirs. In 2005, she began studying classical music at the ArtEZ School of Music where she focused on classical singing and musical theater. In 2009, she received her degree with honors.

Meanwhile, she expanded her vocal technique and began to combine her classical training with heavy metal music. She also worked on the theory of composition, wrote poetry and organized classical music concerts.

Career

Ex Libris (2004–present) 

After graduating with a Bachelor and master's degree from the ArtEZ school and perfecting the combination of classical techniques with progressive metal music, Dianne van Giersbergen formed Ex Libris along with drummer Joost van de Pas.

Their debut album "Amygdala" was released in 2009. The album was well received by critics and fans, and the band started to act as support for shows of other Dutch symphonic metal bands such as Epica, Delain, Stream of Passion or ReVamp. They also played shows abroad in countries such as Germany, France, Belgium and the United Kingdom, where the band started to receive attention.

Their second album "Medea", based on a Greek tragedy, was released in January 2014, financed independently through crowdfunding.

Their third studio album Ann – A Progressive Metal Trilogy appeared in 2019, featuring three "Chapters" (each consisting of three songs) about three female historical characters who met an untimely death (Anne Boleyn, Anastasia Romanova and Anne Frank).

Xandria (2013–2017) 

On 25 October 2013, Dianne van Giersbergen was presented as the new lead singer of the German symphonic metal band Xandria after the departure of Manuela Kraller. On 28 November 2013, was her first live debut with Xandria in Madrid, Spain. Her debut album with the band was released on 2 May 2014, named Sacrificium.

On 31 July 2015, her second work with Xandria called Fire & Ashes was released with a total of seven tracks: three new songs, two remakes of well known Xandria classics, and two cover songs.

On 27 January 2017, her third and current work with Xandria titled Theater of Dimensions was released.

On 13 September 2017, she left Xandria due to personal reasons and tensions with the other band members.

Solo career (2022–present) 
Dianne van Giersbergen announced on 19 October 2022, that she would begin working on her debut solo album alongside Joost van den Broek. The album, which will be called Soulward Bound, also contains the single "After the Storm", which was released on 14 February 2023. During a live chat on the release day of the single, van Giersbergen, revealed that it might take five years for the album to come out.

Reviews 
Giersbergen's vocal and performing delivery can pull in the audience, according to a review in Mindbreed. Reviewer Tim Blevins in 2014 noted that Giersbergen seemed to be a "good fit" for the band Xandria. Reviewer Eric May in 2013 in New Noise magazine described her as a "sultry siren" and wrote that there was "something majestically powerful in her mesmerizing vocal harmonies." Another reviewer described her vocals as "breathtaking" with great personality, charisma and charm.

Discography 

Studio albums:
 Soulward Bound (2028)

Singles:
 "After the Storm" (2023)

Ex Libris 
Studio albums:
 Amygdala (2008)
 Medea (2014)
 Ann (A Progressive Metal Trilogy) (2019)

EPs:
 Ann – Chapter 1: Anne Boleyn (2018)
 Ann – Chapter 2: Anastasia Romanova (2019)
 Ann – Chapter 3: Anne Frank (2019)

Xandria 
Studio albums:
 Sacrificium (2014)
Theater of Dimensions (2017)

EPs:
 Fire & Ashes (2015)

Guest appearances 
Electric Castle Live by Ayreon (2019)
Transitus by Ayreon (2020)
Eden by Archie Caine (2022)
Tommy And The Angels by Archie Caine (2022)

References

External links 
 
 
 Xandria website
 Ex Libris website

1985 births
Women heavy metal singers
Dutch heavy metal singers
Dutch operatic sopranos
Living people
Dutch women singer-songwriters
Vocal coaches
21st-century Dutch women opera singers
People from Boxtel